Camden Safe Deposit & Trust Company is located at Camden in Camden County, New Jersey, United States. The building was built in 1929 and was added to the National Register of Historic Places on August 22, 1990.

Patterned after the Riccardi Palace in Florence, Italy, the four-story building rises directly from the side walk on the northeast corner of Market Street and Broadway.  The first and second levels on the Market and Broadway facades have a rusticated finish. An addition was added to the roof in the 1950s.

See also
National Register of Historic Places listings in Camden County, New Jersey

References

External links
 
 CamdenNJ-Banks-CamdenTrust.htm

Buildings and structures in Camden, New Jersey
Commercial buildings on the National Register of Historic Places in New Jersey
Commercial buildings completed in 1929
National Register of Historic Places in Camden County, New Jersey
New Jersey Register of Historic Places
Bank buildings on the National Register of Historic Places in New Jersey